Port Jackson, an electoral district of the Legislative Assembly in the Australian state of New South Wales, was established in 1991. It was abolished in 2007 and substantially replaced by the recreated electorates of Balmain and Sydney.


Election results

Elections in the 2000s

2003

Elections in the 1990s

1999

1995

1991

References

New South Wales state electoral results by district